Simon James Smith (born 16 September 1968) is a British animator, film director, and voice actor. He is best known for his work at DreamWorks Animation. Smith came to PDI/DreamWorks in 1997 as head of layout for the company's feature film division. A CG animation veteran with nearly 35 years of experience, Smith supervised the layout department on PDI/DreamWorks' first animated feature Antz, serving as the Head of Layout in Shrek. He then directed the Universal Studios Theatre experience Shrek 4-D, followed by the short Far Far Away Idol. His first feature film as a director was in 2007, with Bee Movie. He then directed another DVD short, Megamind: The Button of Doom, before co-helming, with Eric Darnell, the comedy/spy action spin-off from the Madagascar series, Penguins of Madagascar, the mini series "Baymax Dreams" for Disney, and is executive producer "Batwheels" for Warner Bros.

Early and personal life
Smith was born in Watford UK, to English parents. He grew up in Hatch End, Middlesex, before moving into London proper in 1982.

Career
Smith began his career in London, where he worked as a boom operator/sound assistant working on various film and tv productions. He discovered video editing at the advertising agency BBDO, editing on the Apple and Pepsi accounts. He then jumped over to post production house SVC Television, to continue editing but there he also discovered the computer graphic machine Symbolics. He fell in love with the evocative combination of art and technology and taught himself how to animate. He continued animating and FX supervising on various projects at the editing and effects house Framestore and post house VTR, where he established his own 3D department. Immediately prior to joining PDI/DreamWorks, Smith served at The Mill as the CG supervisor on commercial projects for Nike, Honda, Volvo and VW Polo. 

He was a pioneer in the field of pre-visualization, becoming the second ever Head of Layout in cinema history on the film Antz, using that skill set to create PDI's Layout/Pre Viz Department which became an integral part of PDI's filmmaking process. Smith was also instrumental in helping to set up a CG layout department for Aardman Animation for the production of Chicken Run. Known for his work on the award-winning pop video Go West for the Pet Shop Boys, Smith also received the first ever Gold Leaf Award for his 3D directorial work on the commercial West Lites. Smith supervised the layout department on PDI/DreamWorks' first animated feature Antz, serving as the head of layout in Shrek. He then directed the Universal Studios Theatre experience Shrek 4-D, followed by the short Far Far Away Idol. His first feature film as a director was in 2007, with Bee Movie. He then directed another DVD short, Megamind: The Button of Doom, before co-helming, with Eric Darnell, the comedy/spy action spin-off from the Madagascar series, Penguins of Madagascar.

He then created, wrote, and directed "Baymax Dreams" for Disney. A joint Unity/Disney production to prove that a real time engine could be used to make broadcast tv content. Smith won an Emmy for that project. He is currently executive producer/showrunner on the next Batman CG animated tv series "Batwheels" starring Ethan Hawke for Warner Bros.

Film credits

Directing

Animation

References

External links
 

1968 births
Living people
British animated film directors
British animators
British cinematographers
British film directors
British male voice actors
DreamWorks Animation people
Warner Bros. Animation people